Theory of War is a 1992 novel by American-British writer Joan Brady. was hailed as a "modern work of genius". It took her ten years to write but was rejected by her US agent. It was then published by UK publisher Andre Deutsch and was well received. It became the 1993 Whitbread Novel of the Year and Book of the Year in the UK, won the Prix du Meilleur Livre Étranger in France (as L’Enfant Loué. 1995) and was awarded a National Endowment for the Arts grant in the US.

Plot
It tells the story of her grandfather, a white child sold as a slave right after the Civil War when the Emancipation Proclamation meant that African Americans could no longer be sold, and so many soldiers had died in the war that there were thousands of orphans. The psychological consequences of such a background—for the slave himself and for the generations that followed him—are the main concern of the novel.

References

External links

Long revenge of the bounden boy review from The Independent on Sunday, 31 January 1993]

1992 American novels
Novels about American slavery
Costa Book Award-winning works
Novels about revenge
André Deutsch books
Alfred A. Knopf books